Hansi block is a cluster of villages and Hansi is a small town/ city and a municipal council in Hisar district in the Indian state of Haryana. Its 2011 population is estimated to be 134,568. The name of this village has been taken from Sorukhi -100 trees (rukh in Haryana). When this village came into existence, there was a pond surrounded by 100 trees. ThandiRam Berwal alias Thandiya (Udaipur, Rajasthan) and Rajmal Sheoran (Mandoli Kalan, District Bhiwani) came to this place in 1755 (Vikram Samvat 1812) and named village the name of Sorukhi. In the documents of the British Government, it has been registered under the name of Surkhi.Jat is main caste of this village. Apart from Jat Brahmin, Bania, Khati, Naai, Jogi, Kumhar, Lohar, Jhimar, Dhanak, Chamar, Balmiki, Sansi etc. live in this village. The main language here is Harianvi Boli and people used to Hindi and Urdu also.	 Hisar District has Seven blocks (Narnaund, Adampur, Uklana, Nalwa, Barwala, Hisar and Hansi) and Hansi is one of them and villages of Hansi Mandal are as under-
Dhana Kalan
Dhani Kutubpur
Depal
Kulana
Umara
Sorkhi
Shekhpura
Sultanpur
Dhani Raju
Jamawari
Ramayan
Ghirai
Mehenda
Bhatla
Kheri Gagan Garhi
Chanot Hazampur
Puthi Mangal Khan
Dhana Khurd
Dhani Pal
Kumbha
Dhani Perawali
Rampura
Muzadpura
Kanwari
Dhamana

References

External links
 Barsi Gate,umra gate,Hansi

Cities and towns in Hisar district
Hisar district